Le Boulet is a French action-comedy film directed by Alain Berbérian and Frédéric Forestier, released in 2002.

Plot
Moltès, a killer in prison, plays the lottery every week and sends the tickets with Reggio, a guard, so that the latter's wife, Pauline, can have them validated. One day the ticket is a winner, but Pauline is at a car rally in Africa, unknowingly carrying the ticket with her. Moltès wanting to recover his due, escapes and forces Reggio (the guard) to accompany him. However, he becomes the target of his nemesis, another gangster nicknamed "The Turk" (whose brother was killed by Moltès), and his bodyguard named Requin, a giant with teeth of steel.

Cast
 Gérard Lanvin as Gérard Moltès
 Benoît Poelvoorde as Francis Reggio
 José Garcia as Mustapha Amel, a.k.a. "The Turk"
 Djimon Hounsou as Detective Youssouf
 Rossy de Palma as Pauline Reggio
 Jean Benguigui as Saddam, the store keeper
 Gary Tiplady as Requin The Giant
 Gérard Darmon as Kowalski
 Stomy Bugsy as Malian guy #1
  as Malian guy #2
 Omar Sy as Malian guy #3 Nicolas Anelka as Nicolas, the football player
 Nicolas Koretzky as Jean Monthieux
 Jamel Debbouze as Desert Prison Guard

Production
Shooting took place in Paris and North Africa.

There are numerous cameo appearances; Nicolas Anelka appears as a football player, Jamel Debbouze as a prison guard in Mali, and musicians Stomy Bugsy (former Ministère AMER) and Marco Prince (singer of the FFF) and comedian Omar Sy (the duo Omar et Fred) as killer brothers.
The man who reads a newspaper with Moltès' photo on the back is Jean-Marc Deschamps, the production manager. 
The scriptwriter and producer Thomas Langmann made a small cameo in the role of the Turk's brother.
The Turk's bodyguard (played by Gary Tiplady) is a reference to the notorious hitman known as "Jaws" played by Richard Kiel in the James Bond films The Spy Who Loved Me (1977) and Moonraker'' (1979).

References

External links

2002 films
2002 comedy films
Films directed by Alain Berbérian
Films set in Africa
French comedy films
Films shot in Tunisia
Films shot in Morocco
Films shot in France
Films directed by Frédéric Forestier
Films produced by Thomas Langmann
2000s French films
2000s French-language films